A Sinophile is a person who demonstrates a strong interest for China, Chinese culture, Chinese language, Chinese history, and/or Chinese people.

Those with professional training and practice in the study of China are referred to as Sinologists.

Typical interests 
The overall study of Chinese culture is referred to as Sinology. This could include Chinese fashion styles like Traditional cultural Han Chinese clothing (Hanfu), and Manchu-influenced Chinese clothing (qipao). Another area of Chinese culture is cuisine and liquor, such as Chinese wine culture and baijiu. Medicine, architecture, characters, language (and varieties such as Mandarin and Cantonese), are also areas of interest for Sinophiles.  They also tend to be drawn towards Chinese astrology and horoscopes, as well as Feng Shui and Kung Fu. The history of China, Chinese philosophies and folk religions like Daoism, Chan Buddhism, and Confucianism are also topics of Sinology, as well as the Politics of China, socialism with Chinese characteristics, Dengism, Three Principles of the People, one country, two systems, the Mass Line.  Chinese artwork is a topic of interest for many Sinophiles. The Chinese arts, encompass poetry, literature, music, calligraphy and cinema, as well as Chinese traditional forms of theatrical entertainment such as xiangsheng and operas.

Sinophiles

Europe

Italy 
 Marco Polo, Italian explorer who was one of the first Europeans to visit China and narrated about the nation in his travelogue, The Travels of Marco Polo
 Matteo Ricci, Italian Jesuit who was the first to translate the Confucian classics into Latin and taught European science to the Emperor and the Chinese literati

Russia 
 Dmitri Mendeleev, Russian chemist and inventor
 Leo Tolstoy, Russian writer widely considered one of the world's greatest novelists

Oceania

Australia 
 Edwin Maher, New Zealand-born Australian journalist who worked as a news reader for CCTV-9 until 2017, following a long career on Australian TV

North America

United States 
 Allen Iverson, former NBA star basketball player who has expressed affinity for the country
 Stephon Marbury, former NBA star basketball player who joined the Beijing Ducks and has expressed affinity for the country
 James Veneris, US soldier who defected to China after the Korean War and remained in the country expressing positive feelings until his death in 2004

Asia

Cambodia 
 Norodom Sihanouk, Cambodian king who sought refuge in China and praised the country

India 
 Dwarkanath Kotnis, Indian doctor dispatched to China during the Second Sino-Japanese War

Thailand 

 Sirindhorn, Thai princess who has received awards in China for promoting friendship between the two countries

See also
 Old friends of the Chinese people
 Chinoiserie
 List of sinologists
Taiwanese Wave
 Asiaphile
 Japanophile
 Francophile
 Russophile
 Indophile
 Anglophile
 Germanophile
 Graecophile
 Sinophobia

References

Chinese culture
Admiration of foreign cultures
Orientalism by type
Chinese nationalism
Asian culture